Variations and Fugue on a Theme by Hiller, Op. 100, is a set of variations for orchestra written by the German composer Max Reger in 1904. They are based on an original melodic line by the 18th-century composer Johann Adam Hiller. Reger conducted the premiere in Cologne, Germany on 15 October 1907. Along with the composer's Mozart Variations, the Hiller Variations are one of his most popular and frequently recorded works.

History
Reger was occupied with the Hiller variations at a fairly tumultuous period of his life. In 1906, Reger resigned from the Akademie für Tonkunst and lapsed back into his recurring alcoholism. A planned premier of the work in that year was pushed back.

Description
The work consists of the initial exposition of Hiller's theme followed by eleven variations and a concluding fugue. Like many of Reger's orchestral works, the piece is heavily Brahmsian in both style and sound, even though there is a lot of Wagnerian chromaticism in some variations (Var. XI). The concluding fugue reveals the composer's enthusiasm for the music of Johann Sebastian Bach.

Writing in 1921, the American critic and musicologist James Huneker noted:

Notes

External links 
 

1904 compositions
Hiller
Compositions by Max Reger
Compositions for symphony orchestra
Composer tributes (classical music)